is a heya of sumo wrestlers, part of the Nishonoseki ichimon or group of stables. It was established in February 2018 by the former sekiwake Wakanosato, who branched off from Tagonoura stable, taking two wrestlers from the jonidan division with him (Wakasatake and Wakanoguchi). The stable is situated in Asakusa, Tokyo. As of January 2023, it had nine wrestlers.

Ring name conventions
Wrestlers at this stable have taken ring names or shikona that begin with the character 若 (read:Waka), meaning young, followed by their surname; and later upon promotion to sandanme they will receive a ring name with the suffix 里 (read:Sato), meaning village, in deference to their coach and the stable's owner Wakanosato.

Owners
 2018–Present: 12th Nishiiwa Shinobu (iin, former sekiwake Wakanosato)

Notable active wrestlers

None

Referee
Kimura Kazuma (makushita gyōji, real name Kazuma Okada)

Usher
Hiroyuki (jūryō yobidashi, real name Hiroyuki Kon)
Masao (jūryō yobidashi, real name Noriyuki Otaka)

Hairdresser
Tokoaki (Fourth class tokoyama)

Location and access
Please do not visit them except fan club members.

4 Chome-4-9 Kotobuki, Taitō, Tokyo 111-0042, Japan

Toei Subway Asakusa Line: 3 minutes on foot from Asakusa Station A1 Exit

Toei Subway Oedo Line: 3 minutes on foot from Kuramae station A 5 exit

Tokyo Metro Ginza Line: 3 minutes walk from Tahara Town Station 2 Exit

See also
List of sumo stables

References

External links
Japan Sumo Association profile
Homepage

Active sumo stables